Daucus is a worldwide genus of herbaceous plants of the celery family Apiaceae of which the best-known species is the cultivated carrot. Daucus has about 75 species. The oldest carrot fossil is 1.3 Ma, and was found on the island of Madeira in the Atlantic Ocean.

Description 
Members of Daucus are distinguished within the family Apiaceae by their leaves which are 2–3 pinnatisect with narrow end sections. The genus primarily consists of biennial plants but also includes some annual plants and some perennial herbs.  All Daucus have bristly stems.  The inflorescences are umbels.  The flowers are mostly white, with bracts and bracteoles. The petals may be pure white, reddish, pinkish or yellowish.  They are emarginate above and have pointed, wrapped lobules. The petals are often unequal in size, with petals at the outermost edge of the inflorescence often being larger.  The fruit is an ovoid to ellipsoidal schizocarp, cylindrical or compressed, with ciliate primary ribs and secondary ribs with a row of hooked spines. Some species have a small pale or white edible taproot, similar to a radish, which may or may not be bitter in taste.

Ecology
Daucus pollination is carried out by insects, primarily: Lepidoptera, Coleoptera, Diptera, and Hymenoptera.
It is a cosmopolitan genus with endemic species on most continents as well as on many islands and in isolated areas.  The genus centre is in North Africa and Southwest Asia in the Temperate Zone.  Prolonged dry or cold weather tends to retard growth in Daucus species, but the genus as a whole is evolutionarily adaptative to these conditions.  Some Daucus species accumulate substantial resources in large underground taproots without impeding plant development.  Native to Europe is the carrot, with two subspecies: wild carrot and (subsp carota Daucus carota), a cultivated form of carrot, also called garden carrot.

Four members of the Daucus genus were examined to determine differences in isoenzyme patterns and plastid DNA. The four were: Daucus carota subspecies sativus cultivar Danvers, D. carota subsp. gummifer, D. capillifolius, and D. pusillus.  Although only one form of HSDH (homoserine dehydrogenase) was present in each Daucus line, the rate of migration of HSDH from cv. Danvers was different from that of the others.  Multiple isoenzymic forms of ADH were present in each Daucus cultivar.  Comparison of endonuclease restriction fragment patterns from plastid DNAs digested by BamHI revealed only small differences between plastid DNAs of cv. Danvers and subsp. gummifer, whereas large differences were observed between cv. Danvers and D. pusillus plastid DNA patterns.  No differences were found between cv. Danvers and D. capillifolius plastid DNA patterns when examined using eight different restriction enzymes.  The data indicate that specific isoenzyme and organelle DNA restriction fragment patterns will be useful markers for precise identification of genomes of different Daucus species.

Systematics 
The genus comprises about 75 species, including:

Daucus aureus Desfontaines, yellow fruit's carrot, golden carrot
Daucus aleppicus
Daucus annuus
Daucus arcanus
Daucus aureus
Daucus biseriatus
Daucus blanchei
Daucus broteri Tenore, Brotero's carrot
Daucus capillifolius
Daucus carota  L.,  Wild carrot
Daucus crinitus
Daucus decipiens
Daucus della-cellae
Daucus durieua Lange, Durieu's carrot
Daucus edulis Lowe
Daucus elegans
Daucus glaberrimus
Daucus glochidiatus (La Billardière) Fisch., C.A.Mey. & Avé-Lall.
Daucus gracilis
Daucus guttatus Sibthorp & Smith
Daucus hirtus
Daucus hochstetteri
Daucus humilis
Daucus incognitus
Daucus insularis
Daucus involucratus
Daucus jordanicus
Daucus littoralis Sibthorp & Smith
Daucus mauritii
Daucus melananthos
Daucus microscias
Daucus minusculus
Daucus mirabilis
Daucus montanus Humb. & Bonpl. ex Spreng.
Daucus muricatus* (L.) L.Daucus pedunculatusDaucus pumilusDaucus pusillus Michx., American wild carrotDaucus reboudiiDaucus ribeirensisDaucus rouyiDaucus sahariensisDaucus setifoliusDaucus tenuisectusDaucus tenuissimusDaucus virgatusDaucus yemenensisAllergenicityDaucus has an OPALS allergy scale rating of 10 out of 10, indicating extremely high potential to cause allergic reactions.

References

The article is based on the following sources:
 Seybold Siegmund (eds): interactive'' Schmeil-Fitschen (CD-Rom), Source & Meyer, Wiebelsheim 2001/2002, 
 Daucus,  Flora of China

External links
 species list on the Germplasm Resources Information Network
 Daucus - Synonyms Index synonymique France (French)

 
Apioideae
Apioideae genera